Anastasiya Nikolayevna Kolesnikova (born 6 March 1984) is a former Olympic gymnast who competed for Russia in the 2000 Olympic Games in Sydney, Australia, winning a silver medal.

Eponymous skill
Kolesnikova has one eponymous skill listed in the Code of Points.

Competitive history

See also 
 List of Olympic female gymnasts for Russia

References

External links
 sports-reference.com

1984 births
Living people
Russian female artistic gymnasts
Gymnasts at the 2000 Summer Olympics
Olympic gymnasts of Russia
Olympic silver medalists for Russia
Sportspeople from Kazan
Olympic medalists in gymnastics
Medalists at the 2000 Summer Olympics
Originators of elements in artistic gymnastics
21st-century Russian women